Srebrenik is a city located in Tuzla Canton of the Federation of Bosnia and Herzegovina. It is located in northeastern Bosnia and Herzegovina, near Tuzla. As of 2013, it has a population of 39,678 inhabitants. The town of Srebrenik had a population of 6,694.

History

Prehistory 
Based on unsystematic archaeological research, there have been found what appears to be remains of a neolithic village near Hrgovi Gornji. Further research is required before any conclusions are made.

Medieval 
The earliest historical record documenting Srebrenik is the edict of Stephen II to Ragusa signed on the 15th of February, 1333. According to documents from the same period, Srebrenik was under the administration of župa Usora. Srebrenik fortress, a medieval fortress dating back to at least 1333, is located on the Majevica mountain, providing an important strategic stronghold in the area.

In September 1363, king Louis I of Hungary sent an army to Bosnia, led by his palatine Nicholas Kont. This army suffered substantial losses of Hungarian soldiers and materials under Srebrenik. Among the lost materials was the royal seal, which was replaced afterwards.

After the death of Louis I, numerous other Hungarian conquests occurred. One was led by Sigismund of Luxembourg, whose army besieged and conquered Srebrenik, holding out for the next four years. It was then granted to a Serbian despot Stefan Lazarević although the Hungarian army maintained its garrison for some time after the grant.

Srebrenik again fell under Bosnian control after it was conquered by grand duke Hrvoje Vukčić Hrvatinić. It is not known exactly when the city was recaptured by the Hungarians and for how long Hrvoje Vukčić held the city by himself.

Earliest accounts of Ottoman raiders near Srebrenik have been found in Ragusan letters directed to Sigismund in August 1426, detailing Ottoman activities as follows: Almost entire summer an army composed of about four thousand Turks was in Bosnia; neither lord king of Bosnia nor his barons dared to do anything about them. Duke Sandalj and duke Radoslav Pavlović have managed to achieve peace among themselves. Turks raided parts of Croatia and captured many Croats and Vlachs dwelling there. They raided parts of Usora and Srebrenik twice; they were also present in territories of duke Zlatonosović; these Turks have returned to their lands and few remained in Bosnia. Glorious lord despot, with his nephew Đurađ, as it is told, made peace with Venetians in Zeta; a part of the land remained in possession of lord despot and his nephew and the other in possession of Venetians.By 1462 the entire župa Usora was under Ottoman control, including Srebrenik. Due to failures in logistics and an epidemic, the Ottoman army had to retreat and Matthias Corvinus managed to seize back Srebrenik. In order to further improve defense against future Ottoman attacks, Matthias created banate of Srebrenik in 1464 and granted it to Nicholas of Ilok who later became the titular king of Bosnia.

There are two accounts related to the Ottoman conquest of Srebrenik. According to one, Srebrenik was taken in 1512, together with Teočak. The other version says that Srebrenik was taken together with Sokol and Tešanj in 1521 by the Bosnian sanjak-bey Firuz Bey.

Demographics

1971
33,620 total
 Bosniaks - 24,628 (73,25%)
 Serbs - 5,489 (16,32%)
 Croats - 3,256 (9,68%)
 Yugoslavs - 34 (0,10%)
 others - 213 (0,65%)

1991
In the 1991 census, the municipality of Srebrenik had 40,882 inhabitants:
30,595 Bosniaks (74.8%),
5,326 Serbs (13.0%),
2,761 Croats (6.8%),
and 2,200 others (5,4%).

2013 Census  

Page text.

List of residential places in Srebrenik municipality
The list from 1991: Salihbašići, Babunovići, Behrami, Brda, Brezik, Brnjičani, Cage, Cerik, Crveno Brdo, Čekanići, Ćehaje, Ćojlučko Polje, Ćojluk, Dedići, Donji Moranjci, Donji Podpeć, Donji Srebrenik, Duboki Potok, Falešići, Gornji Hrgovi, Gornji Moranjci, Novo naselje Polje, Gornji Podpeć, Gornji Srebrenik, Huremi, Jasenica, Ježinac, Kiseljak, Kuge, Like, Lipje, Lisovići, Luka, Ljenobud, Maoča, Podorašje, Previle, Rapatnica, Seona, Sladna, Srebrenik, Straža, Šahmeri, Špionica Centar, Špionica Donja, Špionica Gornja, Špionica Srednja, Tinja Donja, Tinja Gornja, Tutnjevac, Uroža and Zahirovići.

Sport
The local football club, NK Gradina, plays in the First League of the Federation of Bosnia and Herzegovina.

See also
Srebrenik Fortress

References

External links
 Official Website (Bosnian)
 Srebrenik.NETwork city portal (Bosnian language|Bosnian)

External links

 
Populated places in Srebrenik
Cities and towns in the Federation of Bosnia and Herzegovina